Leifidium is a genus of lichenized fungi in the family Sphaerophoraceae. The genus is monotypic, containing the single species Leifidium tenerum, found in Australia and South America. The genus is named in honour of Swedish lichenologist Leif Tibell.

References

Lecanorales
Taxa described in 1993
Monotypic Lecanorales genera
Lichen genera